is the remains of a castle structure in Setagaya, Tokyo, Japan. Its ruins have been protected as a Prefectural Historic Sites.

It is believed that the castle was constructed by the Kira clan in the Ōei Period. Setagaya castle was a mere fortified residence when the castle was built but was expanded and improved the defences by Kira Naritaka in the Sengoku period.

Later, Setagaya castle became one of the castles under the direct control of the Later Hōjō clan. The castle was demolished soon after the Siege of Odawara in 1590. Setagaya castle park and Gōtoku-ji Temple are on site.

References

Castles in Tokyo
Historic Sites of Japan
Former castles in Japan
Ruined castles in Japan
Go-Hōjō clan